Peter Wilson (born 9 October 1996) is a Liberian footballer who plays as a forward for the Liberian national team. He grew up in Sweden, where his family moved when he was three years old.

Career

Club
As a youth, Wilson played for GIF Sundsvall, where he started playing for the senior team in 2016. In 2020, he moved to Sheriff Tiraspol. From 4 February 2021, Peter Wilson represents Podbeskidzie Bielsko-Biała. He signed a contract for six months.

International
Wilson represented Sweden at the under-15, under-16, and under-19 levels. He made his debut for Liberia against Chad on 9 October 2019.

Career statistics

International
Statistics accurate as of matches played 16 November 2021

References

External links

1996 births
Living people
Sportspeople from Monrovia
Liberian footballers
Swedish footballers
Sweden youth international footballers
Liberia international footballers
Association football forwards
Allsvenskan players
GIF Sundsvall players
FC Sheriff Tiraspol players
Podbeskidzie Bielsko-Biała players
Swedish people of Liberian descent
Sportspeople of Liberian descent
Liberian expatriate footballers
Expatriate footballers in Sweden
Expatriate footballers in Moldova
Expatriate footballers in Poland
Liberian expatriate sportspeople in Moldova
Liberian expatriate sportspeople in Poland
Liberian expatriate sportspeople in Sweden
Olympiakos Nicosia players